The PHP Smart.Framework (smart framework php) is a free, BSD licensed, open-source web framework that claims to fit small, medium as well as large web projects. It provides a hybrid architecture, a mix between multi-tier and Middleware, combined with clean code separation as Model–view–controller architecture.

Components 
It provides a full stack environment:

 PHP framework
 Javascript framework
 Web Profiler
    
Other features:

 Redis based caching layer that can replace Varnish
 database connectors: PostgreSQL, MySQL, SQLite, MongoDB, Solr
 map component that can handle OpenStreetMap (open types) but also Google maps or Bing maps.
 other useful Javascript components

External links 
 Download Page: https://github.com/unix-world/Smart.Framework
 Full Documentation: http://demo.unix-world.org/smart-framework.docs/
 Demo: http://demo.unix-world.org/smart-framework/?/page/testunit/

References

Free software programmed in PHP
PHP frameworks
Software using the BSD license
Web frameworks